The following lists events that happened during 1934 in Chile.

Incumbents
President of Chile: Arturo Alessandri

Events

June
June to July – Ranquil massacre

Births 
27 January – Anselmo Sule (d. 2002)
16 April – Vicar (cartoonist) (d. 2012)
5 August – Guido Mutis (d. 2008)
8 November – Eladio Rojas (d. 1991)
11 November – Carlos Echazarreta Iñiguez

Deaths
11 January – Eugenio Matte

References 

 
Years of the 20th century in Chile
Chile